The Knox and Kane Railroad (K&K) was a short-line railroad in Pennsylvania that operated between Knox, in Clarion County, to Kane and then on to Mount Jewett, in McKean County.

History

Early years
The track and right of way was bought from the Baltimore and Ohio Railroad in 1982 when the B&O discontinued operations on the old Northern Subdivision between Foxburg and Kane. This line was a part of the old Pittsburgh and Western Railroad, originally a  narrow-gauge line created in the latter third of the 19th century from a merging of various earlier narrow-gauge lines.

When the segment of the B&O from Foxburg to Knox was taken out of service, shipping raw materials, mostly glassmaking sand, to Knox Glass became difficult. To ease this situation, a connection with the Conrail (originally the New York Central Railroad) line through Shippenville was put in place. The B&O and NYC crossed each other not too far west of Shippenville for many years, but there had never been provision for interchange between the two roads. Operations in to Knox, which had been the original southern terminus of the K&K, were discontinued around the time the only real customer in Knox, the Knox glass bottle company, ceased operations. This ended the use of the Shippenville interchange.

After the Knox segment was embargoed, the southern terminus became what was known as North Clarion Junction, where there was a fibreboard plant and a wye, the tail track of which had been the P&W's line across to the east side of the Clarion River to the borough of Clarion (county seat of Clarion County). This branch was discontinued at around the time the B&O purchased the P&W. The bridge over the Clarion River needed replacement and the railroad requested that the town help with funding the project. Clarion's town fathers declined this honor, so the railroad cut back service to the west side of the river, which was eventually abandoned as well.

At one time, the K&K derived some revenue from shipping out car loadings of coal from what had once been an extensive coal mining complex in and around the village of Lucinda, a few miles north of North Clarion Junction. During the 1940s, 1950s and early 1960s, under B&O ownership, coal loadings from this area were quite extensive. A conductor's report from one northbound freight train (Foxburg to Kane) in the early 1960s showed in excess of fifty loads of coal shipped north out of Lucinda, most of it bound for ports on the Great Lakes. The last coal shipper on the line, Zacheryl Coal, went bankrupt not too many years after the K&K acquired the line, which materially reduced shipping over the line, and thus reduced income.

Tourist

When Sloan Cornell purchased a portion the K&K line, it began operation a tourist railroad over the segment of the line from Kane to Marienville (originally the site of another of the Knox Glass Bottle Company's plants), and back to Kane. A portion of the Erie Railroad was purchased so that the tourist trains could cross the Kinzua Bridge. The K&K had rostered two steam locomotives, and their first one was No. 38, a 2-8-0 that was transferred from the Gettysburg Railroad in 1986. It was built by Baldwin in 1927 for the Huntington and Broad Top Mountain Railroad. No. 38 had not run since 1988, but was under restoration to be returned to steam. A new tender tank had been constructed. Their second steam locomotive was Tangshan Locomotive and Rolling Stock Works-built 2-8-2 No. 58, which was built as SY1658 in 1989. It was imported new to the Knox and Kane, (one of only six steam engines imported from China after the end of steam in the States) and it was the K&K’s main steam locomotive for several years. As the B&O never saw a need to turn locomotives at Marienville, there was no wye or turntable in that community. So the K&K built a turn table there, specifically to turn its steam locomotive. There was also a four bay roundhouse built in Marienville. Today, the roundhouse is in a considerable amount of disrepair, with three of the four tracks having been removed.  The coaches used on the Knox & Kane were mostly an old type of Long Island Rail Road commuter cars. They were called Ping-Pong cars as they had round windows on the ends and being commuter cars going back and forth they resembled a ping pong ball going back and forth across the ping pong table. This type of car had been dubbed ping pong cars because of their tendency to rock and bounce all over, even when new on well maintained track. The cars were also notorious for rusting, making maintenance on these cars a constant chore. This collection of old and new equipment made for one of the more distinctive tourist train operations in the country, although it was often overlooked because of its remote location.

Final years
In the spring of 2006, the K&K ceased both freight and tourist service. One reason was that freight shipments over the line had declined seriously over the years.  An additional reason the line was abandoned as a tourist operation was that the main attraction of the ride was a trip over the Kinzua Bridge. The viaduct collapsed during a tornado in 2003. When the State of Pennsylvania, which owns the viaduct, could not afford to repair it, the railroad lost its major tourist draw.

In another devastating blow, on early Sunday March 16, 2008 the locomotives used to carry sightseers across the Kinzua Bridge were severely damaged by a fire set by arsonists. The fire, which burned the Biddle Street building used to house the trains in Kane, Pennsylvania caused $1 million in damage. This further dampened the dream of reopening the railroad.

End of the line
On October 10 and 11, 2008, the K&K's rolling stock was auctioned off as part of a liquidation sale.  The Kovalchick Corporation (which also owned the East Broad Top Railroad) bought the property. According to an article published in the Bradford Era newspaper immediately following the auction, the Kovalchicks reportedly had "little interest in resuming tourist rides along the rails."

In the spring of 2010, Kovalchick removed the rail crossings between Clarion and McKean counties. The section between the Bridge State Park and Center St. and Peterson St. (Mount Jewett) is now the Knox Kane Rail Trail.

Equipment 
The K&K rostered several locomotives, including three that were transferred from the Gettysburg Railroad, and one that was constructed in China. They also owned various passenger cars from the Long Island, the Pennsylvania Railroad, and the Delaware and Hudson, as well as some transferred from the earlier Penn-View Mountain Railroad. All of them were sold off to separate owners by 2009.

Locomotives 

 Huntingdon and Broad Top Mountain steam 2-8-0 38. It was transferred from the Gettysburg Railroad. It is currently undergoing restoration by the Everett Railroad to run again.
 China Railways steam 2-8-2 58. It was originally constructed in China exclusively for the railroad’s operations. It is currently operational at the Valley Railroad in Connecticut in a New Haven livery.
Durham and Southern diesel 80-ton  switcher 1. Presumably scrapped in 2004.
 Western Maryland diesel GP9 39. It was renumbered from 6414 to 14 after being purchased from the Chessie System. It was briefly transferred to the Gettysburg Railroad, where it was renumbered to back to 39, and it was eventually returned to the Knox and Kane. It is currently undergoing restoration by the Georges Creek Railway.
South Buffalo diesel S-6 44. It is currently operational at the Genesee Valley Railroad in New York as 1044.
 Norfolk and Western diesel RS-36 70. It was transferred from the Gettysburg Railroad. It was scrapped in 2004.
Pennsylvania Railroad diesel SW7 9090. Presumably scrapped after being purchased by the Texas Northwestern Railway.

Rolling stock 

 Pennsylvania Railroad caboose 477768. It is currently used regularly by the Colebrookdale Railroad.
 Pennsylvania Railroad caboose 23016. Scrapped after being burnt down by the shed fire.
 Caboose 21064. It is currently owned by a private collector in Kane in a B&O livery.
 Open air car 100. Current status unknown.
 Open air car 604. Current status unknown.
 Passenger car 215. Current status unknown.
 Passenger car 217. Current status unknown.
 Delaware and Hudson passenger car 241. Scrapped after being burnt down by the shed fire.
 Passenger car 706 Kinzua Concessions. Current status unknown.
 Passenger car 782. Current status unknown.
 Passenger car 3571. Currently at The Heber Valley Railroad, in Heber City, Utah.
 Passenger car 3599. Current status unknown.
 Passenger car 3607. Current status unknown.
 Long Island passenger car 7002. Current status unknown.
 Long Island passenger car 7031. Current status unknown.
 Long Island dining car 7099. It currently resides at the Walkersville Southern Railroad.
 Long Island passenger car 7109. Current status unknown.
 Long Island passenger car 7433. It currently resides at the Oyster Bay Railroad Museum.
 Delaware and Hudson baggage car 478. Current status unknown.
 Baggage car 444. Current status unknown.
 Baggage car 710. Current status unknown.
 Chesapeake and Ohio flatcar 80524. Current status unknown.
 Boxcar 1302. Current status unknown.
 Boxcar 1305. Current status unknown.
 Hopper car 2663. Sold to the Everett Railroad in 2007.

References

Sources

External links 
Kovalchick Corporation

Defunct Pennsylvania railroads
Transportation in Clarion County, Pennsylvania
Transportation in Forest County, Pennsylvania
Transportation in McKean County, Pennsylvania
Defunct companies based in Pennsylvania